Crișana is a geographical and historical region in north-western Romania, named after the Criș (Körös) River and its three tributaries: the Crișul Alb, Crișul Negru, and Crișul Repede. In Romania, the term is sometimes extended to include areas beyond the border, in Hungary; in this interpretation, the region is bounded to the east by the Apuseni Mountains, to the south by the Mureș River, to the north by the Someș River, and to the west by the Tisza River, the Romanian-Hungarian border cutting it in two. However, in Hungary, the area between the Tisza River and  the Romanian border is usually known as Tiszántúl.

History

Ancient history 

In ancient times, this area was settled by Celts, Dacians, Sarmatians, and Germanic peoples. In the first century BC, it was part of the Dacian Kingdom under Burebista.

Middle Ages 

In the Middle Ages, it was ruled by the Hunnic Empire, the Kingdom of the Gepids, the Avar Empire, the Bulgarian Empire and the Kingdom of Hungary.

Hungarian maps based on the Gesta Hungarorum call it Kazárország which according to Simon of Keza was ruled (under Zvataplug son of Morout), by Morout's grandson Menumorout (Stallion of Morout). Morout was a Prince of Poland who had supposedly subdued Bractari and ruled as Emperor of the Bulgars and Moravians. Prince Morout occupied Crișana and the people that are called Cozar inhabited that land. Prince Morout's son Zvataplug appears to have been the father of Prince Morout's grandson Menumorout who succeeded Zvataplug and wed his daughter to Árpád's son Zoltán of Hungary father of Taksony of Hungary.

The largest city in the region, Oradea, was most probably established during the early years of Hungarian rule. It is first mentioned in 1113 under the name "Varadinum" in a diploma belonging to Benedictine Zobor Abbey. The Romanian name Oradea originates from the Hungarian name Várad, meaning "fortified place". The city was one of the most important cultural centres of the medieval Hungarian state: two Hungarian kings, Ladislaus I (1077-1095) and Sigismund (1387-1437) were buried there. After the canonization of Ladislaus I in 1192, his shrine at Várad became a Catholic pilgrimage site.

Modern History 

After the Battle of Mohács (1526), the region became part of the Eastern Hungarian Kingdom. In 1552, the Ottoman Empire occupied the southern part of Crișana and included it in the newly established Temeşvar Eyalet. According to the Treaty of Speyer (1570), the rest of Crișana became part of the Principality of Transylvania, a successor state of the Eastern Hungarian Kingdom. 
John Sigismund Zápolya abdicated as King of Hungary and in return, Maximilian II of Habsburg recognized John Sigismund's authority over the eastern territories of the Kingdom of Hungary. John Sigismund became princeps Transsylvaniae et partium regni Hungariae dominus – Prince of Transylvania and of a part of the Kingdom of Hungary (Partium). Crișana was included in the Partium.

The Ottoman Varat Eyalet that was formed in the second half of the 17th century was centered on Crișana. Since the end of the 17th century, the whole region became part of the lands of the Habsburg monarchy and was administratively divided between the Habsburg Kingdom of Hungary, the Habsburg Principality of Transylvania and the Habsburg Military Frontier.

Following the abolition of the Theiß-Muresch section of the Habsburg Military Frontier (in 1750) and the abolition of the Principality of Transylvania in 1867, the whole area was included again into the Kingdom of Hungary, which was then part of the dual monarchy of Austria-Hungary. During Habsburg administration, Crișana did not, on the whole, have special status such as that of Transylvania or the Banat; briefly, from 1850 to 1860, it was organized as the Military District of Großwardein. After disintegration of the Austro-Hungarian Empire in 1918, Crișana was divided between Romania (eastern part) and Hungary (western part).

Geography
Romanian Crișana is bounded in Romania by Maramureș to the north, Transylvania proper to the east, Banat to the south, and Hungary to the west. The region consists of the current Romanian counties of Arad (most of it), Bihor and some parts of Sălaj, Satu Mare, parts of Maramureș County (Codru, Chioar) and Hunedoara counties. Nowadays it is sometimes considered part of the historical region Transylvania, although it did not fall fully within the boundaries of the historical principality.

Hungarian Körösvidék is covered by the areas of Hajdú-Bihar County and Békés County. The southern part of Crișana, near the Mureș River, was called Pomorišje by the Serbs.

Cities
The most important cities are:
 Zalău, Oradea, Arad, Salonta, and Beiuș (in Romania)
 Debrecen, Békéscsaba, and Gyula (in Hungary)

Gallery

See also
 Partium

References

External links

 
Historical regions of Transylvania
Historical regions in Hungary
Historical regions in Romania
Divided regions